The Moment is an album by pianist Kenny Barron which was recorded in 1991 and released on the Reservoir label.

Reception 

In his review on AllMusic, Ken Dryden states "This trio date, with the superb rhythm section of bassist Rufus Reid and drummer Victor Lewis, is one of Barron's most essential releases from the entire decade ... Highly recommended".

Track listing 
All compositions by Kenny Barron except where noted.
 "Minority" (Gigi Gryce) – 7:33
 "Fragile" (Sting) – 8:39
 "Silent Rain" – 4:47
 "I'm Confessin' (That I Love You)" (Al J. Neiburg, Doc Dougherty, Ellis Reynolds) – 7:39 	
 "Jackie-ing" (Thelonious Monk) – 8:31
 "Tear Drop" – 8:47
 "The Moment" – 9:36 	
 "Soul Eyes" (Mal Waldron) – 7:17
 "How Deep Is the Ocean?" (Irving Berlin) – 8:21

Personnel 
Kenny Barron – piano
Rufus Reid – bass (tracks 1, 2 & 4–9)
Victor Lewis – drums (tracks 1, 2 & 4–9)

References 

Kenny Barron albums
1992 albums
Reservoir Records albums
Albums recorded at Van Gelder Studio